Leonello Rabatti (born 7 November 1960, Reggello, Italy) is an Italian poet and critic. He lives in Prato and has privately published two volumes of poetry. He received a degree in Modern Literature from the University of Florence.

Rabatti has contributed poetry and prose to several Italian magazines, including "Semicerchio","Collettivo R", "Pietraserena", "Hebenon", "Spiritualità e letteratura." He has also participated in various poetry and musical events in Florence and elsewhere in Italy.

Selected works
Limite del silenzio (1992)
Destino (1995).

Poetry included in anthologies
 Poeti di Novecento (1994)
 Nostos – Poeti degli anni Novanta a Firenze (1997)

References

External links
An interview with Leonello Rabatti (Italian)
About Leonello Rabatti

Italian poets
Italian male poets
Living people
1960 births